Les Rois du gag is a 1985 French comedy film directed by Claude Zidi. It was released on 12 March 1985 in France.

Plot 
Paul Martin and François Leroux are brothers-in-law, friends, room-mates and gagmen without fame. But one day, one of the most famous television comics, Gaëtan, who has just laid off two of his gagmen considered too old and not original enough, finds himself in the little theatre where Paul and François produce themselves under the name of "Gagsters". Having come to meet Georges Khorseri, a mate of Paul and François, he assists for the first part at their duet. Seduced by their style, he hires them.

For both of them, it is the beginning of the fame, but Gaëtan has a hard time to convince his wife, the shrewish Jacqueline, that he loves his troublemaker job, because she dreams of his as the role of the prestigious director Robert Wellson (a grotesque pastiche between Orson Welles and Stanley Kubrick), who will soon shoot his latest masterpiece near Paris.

Cast 
 Michel Serrault ... Gaëtan / Robert Wellson
 Gérard Jugnot ... Paul Martin
 Thierry Lhermitte ... François Leroux
 Macha Méril ... Jacqueline
 Mathilda May ... Alexandra
 Didier Kaminka ... René
 Coluche ... Georges Khorseri
 Maurice Baquet ... Robert
 Pierre Doris ... Jean
 Carole Jacquinot ... Catherine Martin
 Ticky Holgado ... the man who files a claim for injuries
 Pierre Tchernia ... the Césars host
 Claude Brasseur ... himself at the César (uncredited)
 Philippe Noiret ... himself at the César (uncredited)
 Pierre Richard ... himself at the César (uncredited)

Cultural references and parodies 
The program and the character of Gaëtan were freely inspired of the humour programs of the period hosted by Stéphane Collaro and his team in the mid-1980s with The Collaro Show and Benny Hill.

The director Robert Wellson is a parody of Orson Welles, with close resemblances with Jean-Luc Godard and Frederico Fellini.

On the filming stage of Robert Wellson (Michel Serrault), Jacqueline (Macha Méril), the spouse of Gaëtan (also Michel Serrault), recommends to the make-up artist not to put too much face powder on the face of her husband, arguing that his character "comes out of the sewers, not from La Cage aux Folles".

Production 
At the beginning, the scenario was written by Les Charlots and Michel Serrault but because of a problem between the group and the director, the film was re-written for Gérard Jugnot and Thierry Lhermitte.

The role of Georges, the hysterical comic, was portrayed by Coluche who made one of his last film appearances before his tragical death on motorcycle.

Claude Brasseur, Philippe Noiret, Pierre Richard and Pierre Tchernia appeared in their own role during a sketch of fake awards.

References

External links 

1985 films
French comedy films
1985 comedy films
Films directed by Claude Zidi
Films scored by Vladimir Cosma
1980s French films